Sphingomorpha is a genus of moths of the family Erebidae first described by Achille Guenée in 1852. Some species, such as Sphingomorpha chlorea, are notorious pests in orchards, and are known as fruitsucking or fruit-piercing moths.

Description
Palpi upturned, where the second joint reaching vertex of head, smoothly scaled and somewhat thickened. Third joint long and very slender. Antennae of male with slight fasciculated (bundled) cilia on underside. Thorax and abdomen smoothly scaled. Tibia hairy. Fore tibia clothed with tufts of immensely long hair in male. Forewings long an narrow. Costa arched before the apex. Outer margin obliquely rounded, with crenulate cilia. Hindwings with outer margin excised from vein 2 to anal angle.

Species
Species include:
Sphingomorpha chlorea (Cramer, 1777) (Africa / Asia)
Sphingomorpha hemia Guenée, 1852 (from Indonesia)
Sphingomorpha marshalli Hampson, 1902 (from Zimbabwe)

References

Ankita Gupta & Smetacek, P., 2011. A new larval host record for Sphingomorpha chlorea (Cramer) (Insecta: Lepidoptera: Noctuidae) from Karnataka, India. Journal of Threatened Taxa 3(2): 1553-1554

Erebinae
Moth genera